Bradley James Nelson (born 16 May 1962) is an American roboticist and entrepreneur. He has been the Professor of Robotics and Intelligent Systems at ETH Zurich since 2002 and is known for his research in microrobotics, nanorobotics, and medical robotics.

In 2005, Nelson was chosen as one of Scientific Americans top 50 leaders in science and technology for his work on practical applications of nanotubes.  In 2019 he received the IEEE RAS Pioneer Award from the IEEE Robotics and Automation Society, "In recognition of outstanding contributions in micro and nano robotics".  He is a co-founder of Aeon Scientific AG, Femtotools AG, OphthoRobotics AG, Magnes AG, Oxyle AG, and MagnebotiX AG.

Education

 Ph.D. in Robotics (Robotics Institute, School of Computer Science), Carnegie Mellon University, 1995
 M.S. in Mechanical Engineering, University of Minnesota, 1987
 B.S. in Mechanical Engineering, University of Illinois Urbana-Champaign, 1984, University Honors/Bronze Tablet.

Career
Nelson held positions at Motorola and at Honeywell, and served with the United States Peace Corps in Botswana, Southern Africa.  
After earning his Ph.D. from Carnegie Mellon University in 1995, Nelson became an Assistant Professor at the University of Illinois at Chicago, He moved to the University of Minnesota as an  Associate Professor in 1998. In 2002 Nelson became a Full Professor of Robotics and Intelligent Systems at ETH Zürich, Switzerland.

Research

Nelson has over thirty years of experience in the field of robotics. He specializes in nanotechnology and the development of microscopic robots for use in medicine and other applications.  He is particularly known for his work in developing soft, biologically-inspired flexible architectures.

In early research at ETH Zurich, researchers from the Institute of Robotics and Intelligent Systems (IRIS), led by Nelson, developed a robot to play nanosoccer on a field of play the size of a grain of rice.  The international RoboCup Nanogram demonstration events were supported by the U.S. National Institute of Standards and Technology (NIST) in 2007, 2008, and 2009. The goal was to develop microrobots that could perform soccer related tasks, as a demonstration of the feasibility of fabricating Microelectromechanical systems (MEMS) on semiconductor chips.
Magnetic fields were used to move the robot on a flat surface.
ETH Zurich placed first in the 2007 RoboCup Nanogram Competition and was one of two teams to perform successfully in the 2009 competition.

Like a number of Nelson's robots, the rod-shaped microrobot was inspired by a biological form, in this case Escherichia coli bacteria.  Magnetic fields are used to affect the orientation of the robot's "flagella", causing it to move. External magnetic fields are generated using eight electromagnets which allow the operator of the microrobot to move it along the x, y and z-axes in any desired direction.  
Development of nanoelectromechanical systems (NEMS) can require novel materials and may involve unique effects which occur at a nanoscale,  Nelson's rod-shaped robots required the development of a material that would be highly sensitive to magnetic fields, made by combining the elements  cobalt and samarium.

Such robots have been tested within the vitreous humor of the eye to deliver drugs to the retina.  Microrobots have also been specialized to report oxygen levels in the retina by releasing a fluorescent dye that fades at a rate that indicates the presence of oxygen.
Other possible areas that have been suggested for medical applications include the heart, urinary tract, small intestine and the brain, which are difficult to reach. Water treatment and environmental cleanup are also possible application areas where nanobots could be used.

The use of specialized 3-D printers makes it possible to develop new types of materials for use in microrobots such as polymers.  
As of 2015, Nelson and Christofer Hierold  collaborated to develop a robot made from a biocompatible biopolymer that can dissolve in the body once the robot's task is completed.

In collaboration with a team led by Selman Sakar of the Ecole Polytechnique Federale de Lausanne (EPFL), Nelson's team has developed soft-architecture microswimmer robots whose design incorporates folding techniques similar to Japanese origami. The design mimics the ability of micro-organisms to change shape in response to changing environmental conditions. The robot is made up of a multilayered structure of various hydrogels, which respond differentially to environmental conditions such as pH, temperature, or light. In response to such changes, the biopolymers expand or contract, causing the robot to change shape. The design was inspired by Trypanosoma brucei bacterium, the cause of sleeping sickness.  The bacterium has a long narrow shape for moving through bodily fluids and a stubby, compact shape which it reaches its target area.

In collaboration with Daniel Ahmed of ETH Zurich, Nelson has developed magnetic beads whose movement can be guided against a fluid current. 
The beads are made of a hydrogel nanocomposite containing particles of iron oxide and a polymer. Bead swarms have been studied using liquid-filled glass tubes to similulate the types of conditions that might be found in blood vessels   to   micrometres thick. In the same way that someone travelling up a river might hug the banks where the current is slower, the scientists operating the microbeads keep them near the sides of the glass tubes. They use ultrasound to move the microbead cluster toward the wall of the tube, and a rotating magnetic field to move the swarm against the current.

Nelson's microrobotic systems have also been used by Hannes Vogler, Ueli Grossniklaus and other researchers in the Department of Plant and Microbial Biology at Zurich to study the trapping mechanism of Venus flytrap (Dionaea muscipula). Researchers discovered a previously unknown mechanism by which the plant traps prey, with a single slow touch triggering the fly trap to close. They were able to mathematically model the angular deflection and velocity thresholds involved in the snapping mechanism.

Honors and awards
Nelson has received a number of awards for his work in robotics, nanotechnology and biomedicine.

 2020 Sheikh Hamdan bin Rashid Al Maktoum Award for Medical Sciences
 2019  IEEE RAS Pioneer Award, IEEE Robotics and Automation Society, "In recognition of outstanding contributions in micro and nano robotics"
 2016 European Research Council Advanced Grant (Soft Micro Robotics, or SOMBOT)
 2014 First Place: Mobile MicroRobot Challenge, ICRA
 2012 Guinness Book of World Records for "Most Advanced Mini Robot for Medical Use."
 2011 European Research Council Advanced Grant (Microrobotics and Nanomedicine, BOTMED)
 2011 IEEE Fellow, IEEE ROBOTICS & AUTOMA
 2010 ASME Fellow, American Society of Mechanical Engineers
 2009 ETH Zurich Team, First Place: RoboCup Nanogram Soccer
 2007 ETH Zurich Team, First Place: RoboCup Nanogram Soccer
 2005 Scientific American 50: SA 50 Winners and Contributors, Scientific American
 1999 McKnight Land-Grant Professorship in Mechanical engineering, University of Minnesota

Bibliography

Books

Papers
Nelson's research group has won more than a dozen best paper awards at various international conferences and in international journals. Paper awards given are indicated after the citation information.

 
 
  -  2015 T-ASE Best New Application Paper Award, IEEE CASE
  -  Best  Paper  Award  in  medical  robotics  at  ICRA  2014 
 * - 2013 Journal of Laboratory Automation Ten Award, JALA Ten
 
 
 
  -  2014 Best Medical Robotics Paper Award, ICRA

See also
 Raffaello D'Andrea
 Roland Siegwart
 Vijay Kumar (roboticist)

References

External links

Oral History
 "BRAD NELSON: An Interview Conducted by Peter Asaro", IEEE History Center, 17 July 2011.  Interview #738 for Indiana University and IEEE History Center, The Institute of Electrical and Electronics Engineers Inc.

Talks & media
 MSRL on CNN's segment "Make - Create - Innovate"
 TEDx Zurich, 2012
 TV appearance "NOVA Making Stuff Smaller", 2011

1962 births
Living people
American roboticists
Grainger College of Engineering alumni
University of Minnesota College of Science and Engineering alumni
Carnegie Mellon University alumni